The Central District of Khorramdarreh County is in Zanjan province, Iran. At the National Census in 2006, its population was 60,027 in 15,317 households. The following census in 2011 counted 65,166 people in 18,888 households. At the latest census in 2016, the district had 67,951 inhabitants in 21,215 households.

References 

Khorramdarreh County

Districts of Zanjan Province

Populated places in Zanjan Province

Populated places in Khorramdarreh County